Byssostilbe is a genus of fungi belonging to the family Clavicipitaceae.

The species of this genus are found in New Zealand.

Species:

Byssostilbe fusca 
Byssostilbe tomentosa

References

Clavicipitaceae
Hypocreales genera